Andy Hunter is a fictional character from the BBC soap opera EastEnders, played by Michael Higgs. He first appeared in the episode broadcast in the United Kingdom on 3 July 2003 and, following the murder of his gangland boss Jack Dalton (Hywel Bennett), became the show's main antagonist up until the character was axed and killed off in the series' 20th Anniversary episode, shown on 18 February 2005.

The character's story arc began with Andy taking over Dalton's position as the leader of his criminal organization, The Firm, and becoming the newly established crime kingpin of Walford in the borough's local community named Albert Square. Soon afterwards, Andy went on to develop a mutual friendship with Dalton's protege-turned-killer Dennis Rickman (Nigel Harman); establish a relationship with local wayward Kat Slater (Jessie Wallace), which led to the pair having a wedding that ended with Kat jilting Andy in favor of his love rival Alfie Moon (Shane Richie); repetitively clash with Dennis' girlfriend and Kat's daughter Zoe (Michelle Ryan) after he blackmails her mother into sleeping with him to get revenge on Alfie; humiliate Dennis' illegitimate father Den Watts (Leslie Grantham) after defeating him in a high-stakes poker game and then exposing his antics to his adopted daughter Sharon (Letitia Dean); feign a romance and subsequent marriage with Kat's best-friend Sam Mitchell (Kim Medcalf) in order to extract control of her family empire; instigate a feud with Sam's cousin Billy (Perry Fenwick) after the latter attempts to warn Sam's mother, Peggy (Barbara Windsor), about his scheme to exploit her financial interests; arrange for Billy's companion Minty Peterson (Cliff Parisi) to get beaten up over his romantic feelings for Sam: build an unlikely friendship with his secretary Pat Evans (Pam St Clement); organize the death of employee Paul Trueman (Gary Beadle) in retribution for attempting to entrap Andy into a police sting operation over his criminal activities; spark a conflict with Paul's adopted father, Patrick (Rudolph Walker), after the latter discovers the truth about his son's fate; and became enemies with Alfie's two cousins, Jake (Joel Beckett) and Danny (Jake Maskall), after having their grandmother Nana (Hilda Braid) attacked in retaliation for the pair stealing his car and later assaulting him.

Eventually, Andy's criminal reign reached its conclusion towards the show's 20th anniversary episode — when Jake and Danny's mob boss, Johnny Allen (Billy Murray), arrived on the square and proceeded to usurp his position as both the square's reigning top dog and Walford's undisputed crime kingpin. In response to this, Andy planned to con £750,000 from Johnny during a criminal transaction between them. However, his plan failed when Andy was betrayed by his henchman Eddie (Daren Elliott Holmes) — who alerted Johnny of his plans to get one over him. This ultimately led to Johnny killing Andy by throwing him off a motorway bridge, thus ending the character's duration on the programme.

Storylines
Andy Hunter first appeared in July 2003 as the representative of Jack Dalton (Hywel Bennett), the reigning gangland kingpin of Walford — a fictionalized borough in East London — and leader of the city's criminal organization: The Firm. He meets up with his close friend Dennis Rickman (Nigel Harman) in Walford's community area, Albert Square, to discuss the latter's intent on getting £20,000 from Dalton; recently, Dennis had been released from prison after serving his sentence for covering-up Dalton's criminal activities. After rewarding Dennis with his £20,000, Dalton plans to have him killed and has Andy summon Phil Mitchell (Steve McFadden) — the square's local hardman — to his office so he can carry out the task. Phil initially complies, but changes his mind when Dennis offers to kill Dalton himself so that the pair would be free from their gangland tormentor. This ultimately leads to Dennis killing Dalton, despite the latter's warnings that both Andy and the police will investigate him. However, it was at that point where is transpired that Dalton has previously ordered the murder of Dennis' father Den Watts (Leslie Grantham) in February 1989.

The next day, Dalton's murder becomes public knowledge and Andy takes control of The Firm. He soon questions both Dennis and Phil about their alleged involvement in Dalton's death, up to the point where he has the mob keep them under surveillance — to which Phil wrongfully assumes is the police led by his arch-rival DCI Jill Marsden (Sophie Stanton). Later on, Andy confronts Phil just as he is about to go on a holiday with his fiancée Kate Morton (Jill Halfpenny) and daughter Louise (Rachel Cox). He explains to Phil that it was the mob and not the police that were keeping him and Dennis under surveillance. When Phil refuses to tell Andy the truth behind the events of Dalton's murder, Andy tricks Phil into exposing Dennis' role by offering him a sweet — to which Andy would take Phil's acceptance as confirmation that Dennis was the one who killed Dalton. This works successfully as Phil takes the sweet before leaving, and Andy later confronts Dennis with the knowledge that he murdered Dalton. Just as it appears that Andy is going to have Dennis killed, however, he instead pardons him and the two proceed to form a mutual friendship from there onwards; though Andy would later trigger Dennis' feud with Phil after he tells Dennis that Phil grassed him to the mob over Dalton's murder. Two months later, Den unexpectedly reappears in Walford after being presumed dead for the past fourteen years. This prompts Andy to order his goons to bring Den to him for a meet-up at the rendezvous point, where Andy decides to condone Den for his previous crimes against The Firm.

Soon afterwards, Andy begins to personally settle himself in the square upon not being around there for most of his occasions. He quickly sparks a relationship with local wayward, Kat Slater (Jessie Wallace), even though she originally turned him down for a date in The Queen Victoria public house. Nevertheless, the pair end up getting engaged after Andy proposes to Kat during their trip to New York City — with Andy hoping to improve from his previous marriage to a woman named Bev years ago. On their wedding day, however, Kat's crush Alfie Moon (Shane Richie) runs into the church and says he loves her; Kat initially pronounces her love for Andy, but ultimately leaves him for Alfie — thus making Alfie and Andy enemies. When Alfie later gets himself involved with debt problems, Kat visits Andy and asks for a £10,000 loan. Andy reluctantly agrees, but later finds out that the couple have been unable to fully repay him on the deadline day. He promptly uses the opportunity to exact revenge on Alfie, but instead blackmails Kat into sleeping with him rather than have Alfie beaten up. Kat initially refuses, but relents when Andy says this will pay off her debts and also threatens to have Alfie killed if she does not relent to his demand. The two later go to bed together, which is secretly filmed by Andy as he had set up a hidden video camera to record everything — as part of his plan to get revenge on Alfie for ruining his wedding to Kat. His plan comes to fruition even at the point where Alfie manages to provide the £10,000 to repay his debt to Andy, but only after Kat had already slept with Andy earlier on. Andy later gives the tape to Alfie, who then watches the events out of curiosity and is heartbroken at what he sees. Alfie later confronts Kat about this and their marriage is nearly destroyed as Andy had hoped to achieve. However, this is unsuccessful as Alfie forgives Kat for her betrayal and they later plot to get payback on Andy. This emerges when Alfie delivers a tape to Andy, who reckons that it is the same tape that Andy had sent to him. However, as Andy starts to watch it, he is taken aback as he discovers it is a different tape of Alfie and Kat's wedding. Andy eventually comes to accept Kat's decision of choosing Alfie over him and allows the couple to proceed with their marriage, but continues to clash with Alfie as their rivalry continues to escalate.

By then, Andy has established himself as the square's newly reigning top dog — a trait which formerly belonged to Phil, until he was forced on the run after Den and Dennis set him up for armed robbery during the Mitchell and Watts' family feud. Andy also cements his position as Walford's undisputed crime kingpin, in the midst of expanding his criminal empire, up to the point where he summons his henchman Eddie (Daren Elliott Holmes) to help maintain his status. Andy later tries to hire Dennis into the business, but this does not last long when Dennis resolves to helping Den co-manage his nightclub: "Angie's Den". As time goes on, Kat's daughter Zoe (Michelle Ryan) begins dating Dennis, and soon finds out about how Andy blackmailed her mother into sleeping with him. Zoe promptly confronts Andy, and ends up hurting her lip following a scuffle between them. Zoe later makes it appear to Dennis that Andy had assaulted her, which causes him to look for him around the square until he spots Andy going to the local bookies. There, Dennis confronts and punches Andy — who is forced to explain what he did to Kat in order to get Dennis to understand the truth about Zoe. A few days later, Den invites Andy to a poker game and the pair go all-in with all their money and assets; Andy wins the final round, but chooses not to take Den's possessions and instead urges him to sort his life out. Den later tries to get revenge on Andy by committing a scam at his bookies, but this fails when Andy discovers his plan, after being informed about this by Den's longtime friend Pat Evans (Pam St Clement) — with whom Andy has developed an unlikely bond, on this occasion. Andy later confronts Den about his scam, and humiliates him in the pub by revealing his gambling bet to his adopted daughter Sharon (Letitia Dean), before comforting Pat after Den refuses to apologize for disrespecting her character in front of everyone in the pub; Andy later hires Pat to become his secretary at the bookies.

Andy soon begins a newfound romance with Phil's younger sister Sam (Kim Medcalf), who has recently taken control of the Mitchell assets following the events of Phil's departure from the square; moreover, the two siblings' hard-man brother Grant (Ross Kemp) is also absent in Walford. It soon becomes clear that Andy is actually forging his relationship with Sam in order to extract control of all her family assets. This continues when Andy proposes to Sam and the pair end up getting married, despite the efforts of Sam's cousin Billy (Perry Fenwick) and his friend Minty Peterson (Cliff Parisi) to stop this by informing her mother Peggy (Barbara Windsor) about his scheme. However, Peggy supports Andy after he tricks her into believing that his intentions to be with Sam are purely for goodwill. When Andy learns that Minty has romantic feelings towards Sam and had nearly ruined their wedding as a result of this, he gets revenge on Minty by arranging for him to get beaten up; Andy later visits Minty in hospital and threatens him to stay away from Sam. But towards the verge of Christmas 2004, Sam discovers the truth about Andy just moments after she ends up losing her ownership of The Queen Vic to Den — who had conned the pub from Sam by blackmailing her lawyer, Marcus Christie (Stephen Churchett), into bankrupting the Mitchell family empire. Upon learning that her family business means nothing to his criminal reign anymore, Andy kicks Sam out of their house and leaves her penniless; she subsequently resides with Minty, after they make amends over what Andy did to them.

In the midst of forging his relationship with Sam, and prior to ending their marriage, Andy decides to expand into drug trafficking and employs her next-door neighbour Paul Trueman (Gary Beadle) into the operation. Paul manages to establish Andy's empire with a succession of his favors. Later on, Andy is contacted by a mob boss called Mr. Corley and his hitman Carter (Michael McKell). They wish for Andy to do a drug trade with them, and he assigns Paul to manhandle the impending transaction. However, Paul ends up getting arrested, and he is forced to grass Andy to the police in order to avoid facing the risk of a prison sentence. Paul later tries to help the police entrap Andy in a sting operation, but Andy intercepts this at the last second and avoids meeting Mr. Corley at the rendezvous point. Returning to his office, Andy finds Carter waiting for him and is given his phone number, to find out who sabotaged their meet-up. Andy confronts Paul in the pub, and deduces his betrayal after noticing Paul's anxiety in being around him. In response, Andy alerts Carter about Paul's betrayal, and arranges for Paul to be escorted by taxi murdered that night.

In January 2005, Andy's feud with Alfie is resurfaced when he instantly clashes with the latter's two cousins Jake (Joel Beckett) and Danny (Jake Maskall) following their arrival on the square — wherein Danny ends up stealing his car, and Jake mocks Andy in public. After ordering Eddie to investigate the pair, Andy learns that Jake and Danny are working for local crime boss Johnny Allen (Billy Murray) — who soon arrives on the square himself. Andy is initially satisfied when Johnny puts Jake and Danny in their place, but his mood changes when Johnny later visits him to request that he hire the duo to work for him at his bookmakers shop: "Turf Accountants". Andy reluctantly agrees, and becomes impressed when Jake and Danny start to work under his compliance, but this quickly grows too much for Danny - up to the point where Danny unexpectedly lashes out at Andy near a bus stop. Jake arrives in time to restrain Danny from their employer, but ends up punching Andy after he proceeds to insult Danny over his behaviour. This provokes Andy into getting revenge on Jake and Danny by arranging for their grandmother, Nana (Hilda Braid), to be mugged in their house and for his goons to steal her beloved ring. This escalates the conflict between Alfie's cousins and Andy himself, until Johnny learns about the situation and intervenes — authorizing Jake and Danny to resume their job while Andy is forced to return Nana's ring to Alfie.

It is at this point where Johnny gradually begins to usurp Andy from his top dog status and criminal reign on the square, going as far as to buy "Angie's Den" just as Andy prepares to take control of it. Later on, Andy becomes unnerved when Paul's adopted father Patrick (Rudolph Walker) begins searching for him and constantly questions Andy about his whereabouts. Andy repeatedly denies any knowledge of Paul's fate, but Johnny soon becomes drawn into the subject after witnessing Patrick confront Andy once more. Johnny later orders for Paul to be retrieved, and Patrick subsequently learns of his son's fate when the police inform him that Paul has been found murdered. After identifying Paul's body to confirm that he is dead, Patrick instantly requests the police to question Andy —  which they do. However, Andy is let off the hook after the police are unable to find evidence against him. Patrick later swears revenge against Andy after confronting him over Paul's death. When Pat quizzes Andy over Paul's murder, Andy confides to her about his involvement, and she ends their friendship as his paranoia grows — up to the point where Andy even threatens to kill Pat, should she tell the police.

In February 2005, Johnny summons Andy and Jake at the bookmakers to request the two work together at carrying out a £750,000 transaction on his behalf — which Johnny claims will secure his retirement from the criminal underworld. Andy is adamant with Johnny's claims that he is retiring from his gangland lifestyle, and is further surprised when Johnny tells him that he will end up receiving just £5,000 of the £750,000 transaction cut — with Jake being granted £2,000. By then, Andy has grown outraged that Johnny is taking charge of his criminal reign. This is further evident when Johnny kicks Andy out of his office for disrupting his meeting with Jake, who was shown to be bleeding after Danny assaulted him — which Andy indirectly caused, by telling Danny that Jake aims to replace him as Johnny's favourite henchman. Later on that night, Andy spirals out of control when Johnny tells him that he will be doing the transaction on his own, after putting Jake out of the deal. Ignoring Eddie's concern over his behaviour, Andy begins to insult Sam and Den until the latter bars him from The Queen Vic — where Johnny and Jake help Den kick Andy and Eddie out of the pub. Shortly afterwards, Andy vows to get one over on Johnny, and hatches a plan to steal his £750,000 from the transaction deal; he later ropes Danny into helping with his scheme. On the night of the deal, Andy succeeds with the trade and betrays Danny by leaving him on the street. However, before betraying him, Andy continues to antagonize Alfie by arranging for the local market to be trashed — which leaves most of the neighborhood feeling traumatized. Shortly after 'helping' Johnny with the trade, Andy is confronted by Alfie and the pair fight over Kat — whom Andy declares his love for, as he blames Alfie for ruining his happiness with her. Danny attempts to help Alfie take on Andy but the pair end up arguing over Danny's interference, and their distraction allows Andy to flee with Eddie in his car.

On their way out of Walford, Andy is surprised when Eddie pulls over — claiming that he needs to use the bathroom. While waiting for Eddie to come back, Andy is surprised when Jake enters the car and Johnny opens his door — telling him that they need to have a 'conversation'. As Jake keeps hold of the £750,000, Andy realizes too late that Eddie betrayed him, and is forced to 'settle' his differences with Johnny. They seemingly part ways when Johnny offers a handshake, which Andy accepts. However, their handshake ends unexpectedly when Johnny – after giving Andy 'one final tip' and saying to him 'Enjoy your flight!' – suddenly forces Andy off the flyover, causing Andy to fall to his death upon hitting the ground. Shortly afterwards, Johnny and Jake leave at the scene of Andy's death, whilst Eddie flees the country for good. Ironically, Andy dies on the same night that Den is bludgeoned to death by his wife Chrissie (Tracy-Ann Oberman). While Den's murder remains a mystery to the square, Andy's death becomes public knowledge when the police are informed about his fate — which is depicted to be a suicide. Sam is asked to attend Andy's will reading, expecting to get all of his money and assets. However, Andy leaves the house to Pat and the bookmakers to Dennis, leaving Sam with just his wedding ring: 'so she can sell it, get her roots done and still be the dumbest blonde I ever knew'. In the only revenge she can exact on her late husband, Sam refuses to attend Andy's funeral — leaving Pat and Johnny to appear as the only guests to witness Andy being laid to rest.

Following Andy's death, Johnny usurps his position as Walford's crime kingpin and ends up having Dennis killed at the end of the year; Dennis had learned on New Year's Eve 2005 that Johnny had not only throttled his pregnant wife Sharon, but also murdered Andy on the night Den died. Eventually, in March 2006, Johnny confesses his killings to the police, at the request of his daughter Ruby (Louisa Lytton) when she learns the truth about her father ordering Dennis to be murdered. Later, in October 2006, Andy's death is avenged by Ruby's boyfriend Sean Slater (Robert Kazinsky) when he causes Johnny to have a fatal heart attack, upon taunting him in a prison visit.

Creation and development

Casting and characterisation
Higgs auditioned for the role in April 2003 and won the part of EastEnders''' new "bad guy", who made his first appearance in July that year as a member of the gangster organisation known as The Firm. Higgs stated that he was happy to play a villain: "They say that the devil has the best tunes, but the main thing is that the character's rounded. With the so-called good guys and bad guys, they're not just good or just bad. There's a dynamic, and that's always the interesting thing to find - where's the weakness? You flesh it out and make them an interesting person."

In the hierarchy of the Firm, Andy's character was a subordinate to Jack Dalton (Hywel Bennett), but was appointed leader of the organisation for a brief time following Dalton's murder. Higgs described the differences between Andy and Dalton's leadership styles: "He's new blood, but he has a completely different sensibility about how the gang operates. Jack Dalton was quite old school. If you upset him you'd get your knee-caps broken or get killed. I think Andy plays more of a psychological game - information is power for him."

Discussing Andy's relationship with Kat Slater (Jessie Wallace), Higgs said, "I think you do see a soft side of him with Kat. He's totally in love with her, which makes him very vulnerable. He's been married before, but the marriage didn't work out. You get the sense that there's some hurt there, some pain that's stopped him becoming involved with other women [...]  he likes the spirit of her. She's no-nonsense, in-your-face and slightly larger than life. Andy likes that scared of no one approach. Kat reminds Andy of his mum, with her dark hair and feistiness. He likes the fact that she's a family girl - that's what he wants."

Departure and death
On 18 November 2004 it was announced that actor Michael Higgs had been axed from his role as Andy Hunter and that his last scenes would be screened in Easter 2005. Higgs' axing from the role came following the decisions to axe fellow cast members Jill Halfpenny and Leslie Grantham. A BBC spokesperson stated, "We thank Michael for all his hard work." It was speculated that the decision to have Higgs written out of the show was to make way for the introduction of Billy Murray as Johnny Allen, whom critics stated made Andy "look like small fry". In an interview on Today with Des and Mel'' in February 2005 Higgs hinted that his character would be killed off. He made his final appearance as Andy Hunter on 18 February 2005, when his character was murdered by Johnny. Leslie Grantham's final scenes as Den Watts were screened the same night as Andy's departure.

See also
List of soap opera villains
List of fictional crime bosses

References

External links

EastEnders characters
Fictional bookmakers
Fictional murderers
Fictional crime bosses
Fictional gangsters
Fictional businesspeople
Fictional characters introduced in 2003
Fictional murdered people
Male characters in television
Fictional henchmen
Mitchell family (EastEnders)